The Public Health Agency (PHA) is a directorate within the New Zealand Ministry of Health responsible for managing population and public health. It was established on 1 July 2022 as part of a large scale reform of public health services in New Zealand.

Leadership
The Public Health Agency is led by Dr. Andrew Old, who assumed the position of Deputy-Director General of the organisation on 18 July 2022.

History
In mid–April 2021, Minister of Health Andrew Little announced that New Zealand's district health board system would be replaced with three new entities including the public health agency, Te Whatu Ora (Health New Zealand), the Te Aka Whai Ora (Māori Health Authority), and the Public Health Authority. The latter would be tasked with centralising the provision of public health services in New Zealand.

In October 2021, the Sixth Labour Government introduced the Pae Ora (Healthy Futures) Bill to entrench the new health system into law. The bill passed its third reading on 7 February 2022. Besides establishing Health NZ and the Māori Health Authority, the legislation also established the Public Health Agency as a directorate of the Health Ministry.

The Public Health Agency formally came into existence on 1 July 2022. It inherited the functions of the former Health Promotion Agency including public health and population health policy, strategy, regulatory, intelligence, surveillance, and monitoring. The new agency will also advise the Director-General of Health on theses issues. In addition, the PHA was tasked with developing a public health strategy to meet the needs of Māori and integrating mātauranga Māori (indigenous Māori knowledge) and tofa loloto (Pacific Islander knowledge) into evidence-based health policy.

On 19 July, the outgoing Director-General of Health Ashley Bloomfield announced that the PHA's Deputy Director-General Andrew Old would assume responsibility for fronting COVID-19 media briefings and press conferences following his departure later in the month.

Notes and references

External links

2022 establishments in New Zealand
Health care in New Zealand
Medical and health organisations based in New Zealand
New Zealand public service departmental agencies